Golden is the fifth studio album by American country music trio Lady Antebellum. It was released on May 6, 2013, through Capitol Nashville in Europe and South Africa, and on May 7, in the US, Canada, Australia, and New Zealand. The production on the album was handled by Nathan Chapman, Paul Worley and Lady Antebellum. The album is the first former EMI title to be fully rebranded as a product of Universal Music. The only reference to its old parent is its UPC. On November 12, 2013, a deluxe edition was released, featuring three new songs and acoustic versions of three hits from previous albums.
 
Golden was supported by three singles: "Downtown", "Goodbye Town", and "Compass". The album received mostly generally positive reviews from music critics for "returning to form," though some critics deemed the album overly-predictable. The album was also a commercial success. It debuted at number one on the US Billboard 200 and US Top Country Albums charts, selling 167,000 copies in its first week. It also peaked at number one on the UK Country Albums Charts and within the top 10 on the Australian, Canadian, Irish, and UK all-genre album charts. The album was certified gold by the Recording Industry Association of America (RIAA) in November 2013.

Promotion

Tour

Lady Antebellum first announced their third headlining tour, The Take Me Downtown Tour, in July 2013, with the first tour date set for November 8. However, the band later decided to push back the tour to accommodate the release of the Deluxe Edition of Golden and in order to prepare a better show. The tour kicked off in January 2014, and was expected to visit over 60 cities across North America. Kip Moore and Kacey Musgraves served as the opening acts.

Singles
The album's lead single, "Downtown", was released on January 22, 2013. It peaked at number two on the Hot Country Songs chart and at number one on US Country Airplay.

"Goodbye Town" was released as a promotional single through iTunes for pre-orders of the album. It was subsequently released as the second official single from Golden on May 13, 2013, and peaked at #11 on the Hot Country chart. The band described "Goodbye Town" as "one of [their] favorite productions" on the record.

The third single, "Compass", was released on October 14, 2013. It is one of the three new recordings featured on the Deluxe Edition of Golden. Lady Antebellum opted to produce the song alongside Nathan Chapman, rather than with their usual producer Paul Worley.

Other songs
An official lyric video was released for the Deluxe Edition track "And The Radio Played" on November 15, 2013, though no plans have been made to date to release the song as a single.

In April 2014, a re-recorded version of "Golden", featuring vocals from Stevie Nicks, was released as a digital single. This version charted at #50 on the Hot Country Songs chart in the first week after its release.

Critical reception

Golden has received mostly positive reviews from music critics. At Metacritic, which assigns a weighted average score out of 100 to reviews and ratings from mainstream critics, the album received a metascore of 70, based on 6 reviews. Eric Allen of American Songwriter told that with just "one listen to Golden [and it] immediately declares that Lady A has returned to form and isn't going anywhere in the imaginable future." At Country Weekly, Joseph Hudak rated the album a B−, and called the first half of the album "a little too polished", but towards the end the band is "close to finding the secret for mixing easygoing music with evocative, mature lyrics. It’s musical alchemy." Glenn Gamboa of Newday graded the album a B, and found that the band is "picking approaches that suit the songs best, rather than what keeps all the talented folks occupied most." At The Oakland Press, Gary Graff evoked that the album "changes things up — subtly, to be sure, but just enough to be perceptibly different from its predecessors", which at the same time "still holds close to the middle of the country road here, but it veers just enough to keep things interesting." Roughstock's Dan MacIntosh alluded to how "Golden may be better than all past Lady Antebellum efforts, but it’s by no means perfect". and yet he wrote that "the result is an album that is truly golden, and really difficult to hate." David Burger of The Salt Lake Tribune graded the album a B−, and found that the release contains "both sweet, full-bodied songs that will sound great on the radio this summer, but also features a lot of filler." At Toronto Star, Ben Rayner evoked that the release is "a touch less prissy and overdressed than the high-gloss wallpaper that has come before," which the band "occasionally takes a stab at rockin’ out in restrained fashion without embarrassing itself at all." Billy Dukes of Taste of Country projected forward by stating that "there’s a new maturity on this record that, if allowed to progress, promises something even bigger with the next album." At USA Today, Brian Mansfield affirmed that "a bittersweet edge makes even the liveliest songs more poignant."

However, Stephen Thomas Erlewine of Allmusic criticized the release as being "so cheerful" that it makes the album seem "a little churlish", and he felt the need "to complain that the songs here aren't grabbers: they're slow burns, designed to sink into the subconscious through repeated plays on radio, in-store sound systems, waiting rooms, and bumper music." Yet, Erlewine noted "that's fine", and called the album a "professional product at its finest, meticulously assembled, polished until it gleams, designed to be nothing more than thoroughly agreeable." At Daily News, Jim Farber highlighted that the album contains songs that are "sun-kissed, expensively constructed, and bound to reap a mint", but that is not necessarily a good thing because "like all Lady A ditties, they’re also lacking in little things like personality, detail and need." At The Gazette, Bernard Perusse told that as a consolation we should "just be happy that this disc is a smooth, pleasant-enough improvement over the last one." Chuck Eddy of Rolling Stone wrote that the release "feels like a house of mirrors". PopMatters' Dave Heaton rated the album a five-out-of-ten, and said that the release is "an overall sedate," and "relatively predictable album".

Commercial performance
Golden debuted at number one on the US Billboard 200 chart, selling 167,000 copies in its first week, according to Nielsen Soundscan. This became Lady Antebellum's third US number one debut. The album also debuted at number one on the US Top Country Albums chart, becoming the group's fourth number one on that chart. In its second week, the album dropped to number five on the chart, selling an additional 56,000 copies. In its third week, the album dropped to number ten on the chart, selling an additional 34,000 copies. On November 20, 2013, the album was certified gold by the Recording Industry Association of America (RIAA) for sales of over 500,000 copies in the US. As of January 2014, the album has sold 558,000 copies in the United States.

Track listing
All songs produced by Paul Worley and Lady Antebellum, except "Compass", produced by Lady Antebellum and Nathan Chapman.

Personnel

Lady Antebellum
Dave Haywood – acoustic guitar, Hammond B-3 organ, mandolin, piano, ukulele, background vocals
Charles Kelley –  lead vocals, background vocals, acoustic guitar, tambourine
Hillary Scott – lead vocals, background vocals

Musicians
Chad Cromwell – drums, shaker, tambourine
Jason "Slim" Gambill – electric guitar
Will Hoge – harmonica
David Huff – drum loops
Rob McNelley – electric guitar
Michael Rhodes – bass guitar
Michael Rojas – Fender Rhodes, Hammond B-3 organ, piano, synthesizer
Biff Watson – acoustic guitar, banjo
Glenn Worf – bass guitar
Paul Worley – acoustic guitar, electric guitar

Design
Terri Apanasewicz – hair stylist, make-up 
Jonna Carter — art direction
Michelle Hall – art producer
Joseph Llanes – photography 
Lee Moore – stylist, wardrobe design
Karen Naff – art direction

Production

Natthaphol Abhigantaphand – assistant engineer
Daniel Bacigalupi – assistant engineer
Steve Blackmon – assistant engineer
Paige Conners – production coordination
Adam Grover – assistant engineer
Erik Hellerman – engineer
Charles Kelley – producer
Joe Martino – assistant engineer
Andrew Mendelson – mastering
Allen Parker – assistant engineer
Clarke Schleicher – engineer, mixing
Nick Spezia – assistant engineer
Brad Winters – assistant engineer
Jeremy Witt – production assistant
Paul Worley – producer

Charts

Weekly charts

Year-end charts

Singles

Certifications

Release history

References

2013 albums
Albums produced by Paul Worley
Capitol Records Nashville albums
Lady A albums